Sense and Sensibilia is the title of:
 Sense and Sensibilia (Aristotle): one of the treatises by Aristotle that make up the Parva Naturalia
 Sense and Sensibilia (Austin): the work of ordinary language philosophy by J. L. Austin

See also 
 Sense and Sensibility